WPMF World Champion 48 kg (Thailand)
WPMF World Champion 50 kg (Japan)
E-1 World Champion WMC 52 kg (Hong Kong)

Zaza Sor. She is the former women's flyweight world champion of the World Professional Muaythai Federation (WPMF). Zaza is also a popular actress and singer in her native country.

Early years
Zaza Sor. She played a lot of sports when she was a kid. While her favorite sport was actually horse riding, her father taught her Muaythai. After three months of training, he sent her to a fight at a temple fair in Saraburi. Zaza won her first match, and started her career as a Muaythai fighter at only thirteen years old.

Rise to the top in Muaythai

Zaza kept on winning her matches and her reputation as an up-and-coming fighter spread in the Muaythai community. She won the vacant WPMF women's World Flyweight title at age of 15 and became the first Thai female to become world muaythai champion. Originally scheduled to fight Canadian Vernica Tiger for the championship on December 4, 2008, Sor Aree defeated Greek Farni Kiatchionson by points decision. On , Sor Aree defeated fellow countrywoman Farsai Nongkipahuyuth by decision, retaining her title.

At the end of 2009 she took part in the IFMA Amateur Muaythai World Championships in Bangkok, Thailand. She won the silver medal in the Flyweight category. On , Sor Aree won her bout by decision against Ploy Suay Sukroong Ruang at Thailand vs Challenger Series.

Mixed fortunes in Shootboxing

Sor Aree also took part in Shootboxing, but with less success. Sor Aree managed to land some good shots but Kate was obviously the harder hitter and towards the end of the match, Sor Aree appeared to be exhausted and in a daze. Kate took advantage of this and trapped her in a standing arm-triangle choke in the third round. Sor Aree’s eyes rolled back into her head and the referee called for the bell as Kate put Sor Aree to sleep.

On August 19, 2011 Sor. Aree competed in Shootboxing for the third time against Shootboxing star Rena Kubota. Rena won the match in the second round when Rena landed a powerful body punch that floored Sor Aree, who was unable to get back up.

Short stint in boxing

In April 2008, Sor. Aree announced that she would try professional boxing. She made her debut on September 5, 2008 against Namfon Por Muangpetch. She won her bout by decision. However, one month later she was defeated by her fellow countrywoman Yani Kokietgym. After her loss Sor. Aree choose not to pursue a full-time boxing career.

Comeback in 2015

After having stopped with professional Muay Thai while pursuing a University degree ZaZa Sor Aree started a comeback in April 2015 (won) and, as the time of writing, is looking to come back full-time while also pursuing further TV and Muay Thai teaching commitments.

Championships and accomplishments

2017 GLORY 46 -Guangzhu China
2017 PPTV S1 One-Songchai Championship Bangkok
2016 E-1 World Champion WMC 52 kg (Hong Kong)
2010 Thailand Versus Challenger Champion-WMC (Queens Cup Thailand)
2009 Silver medal at the IFMA World Muaythai Championship
2009 WPMF World Champion 50 kg (Japan) 
2009 WPMF World Champion 48 kg (Thailand)
2007 Asawindam Stadium Championship (Thailand)
2007 Channel 9 Championship (Thailand)
Winner in Queen's and King's Birthday
Member of Thailand National team
GLORY Kickboxing fighter

Kickboxing record

|- bgcolor="CCFFCC"
| 2018-02-06 || Win ||align=left| Lisa Brierley ||Muay Thai Day|| Bangkok, Thailand || Decision || 3 || 3:00 ||
|-  style="background:#c5d2ea;"
| 2017-10-14 ||	NC ||align=left| Liu Jia||  Glory 46: China|| Guangzhou, China || No Contest (Accidental Elbow) ||2|| 1:10||
|- bgcolor="CCFFCC"
| 2017-02-06 || Win ||align=left| Sylvie von Duuglas-Ittu ||National Muaythai Day - Channel 9|| Bangkok, Thailand || Decision || 3 || 3:00 ||
|- bgcolor="CCFFCC"
| 2016-11-20 || Win ||align=left| Cori Chiu || E-1 World Championship - WMC || Hong Kong - China || Decision || 3 || 3:00 || 
|- bgcolor="CCFFCC"
| 2016-09-16 || Win ||align=left| Emmypisa || S1 - One Songchai - PPTV || Bangkok - Thailand || Decision || 4 || 2:00 || 
|- bgcolor="CCFFCC"
| 2016-21-03 || Win ||align=left| Monika Singpathong || R-1 Knockout Event || Bangkok, Thailand || Decision || 3 || 3:00 ||
|- bgcolor="CCFFCC"
| 2015-08-12 || Win ||align=left| Marcela Soto || The Rising Queen Warrior || Chiangrai, Thailand || Decision || 3 || 3:00 ||
|- bgcolor="CCFFCC"
| 2015-04-26 || Win ||align=left| Krataithong Por Promin || Thapsakae Fight Night || Thapsakae, Thailand || Decision || 4 || 2:00 ||
|- bgcolor="FFBBBB"
| 2011-08-19 || Loss ||align=left| Rena Kubota || Shoot Boxing Girls S-Cup 2011 || Tokyo, Japan || KO (Punch to the body) || 2 || 2:10 ||
|- bgcolor="FFBBBB"
| 2010-08-29 || Loss ||align=left| Kate Martinez || Shoot Boxing Girls S-Cup 2010, 1st round || Tokyo, Japan || KO (Technical submission, standing arm-triangle choke) || 3 || 1:12 ||
|- bgcolor="FFBBBB"
| 2010-05-08 || Loss ||align=left| Ekaterina Izotova || Star of Victory || Moscow, Russia || Decision || 5 || 3:00 ||
|- bgcolor="CCFFCC"
| 2010-01-16 || Win ||align=left| Ploy Suay Sukroong Ruang || Thailand Vs Challenger Series || Bangkok, Thailand || Decision || 3 || 3:00 ||
|-
|- bgcolor="FFBBBB"
| 2009-12 || Loss ||align=left| Jihane Mezyaive || IFMA World Muaythai Championships 2009 || Bangkok, Thailand || Decision || 4 || 3:00 ||
|-
! style="background:white" colspan=9 |
|-
|- bgcolor="CCFFCC"
| 2009-12 || Win ||align=left| Gilberty Santiago Guido || IFMA World Muaythai Championships 2009 || Bangkok, Thailand || Decision || 4 || 3:00 ||
|-
|- bgcolor="CCFFCC"
| 2009-11 || Win ||align=left| || IFMA World Muaythai Championships 2009 || Bangkok, Thailand || Decision || 4 || 3:00 ||
|-
|- bgcolor="CCFFCC"
| 2009-11-08 || Win ||align=left| Gracyer Aki || M-1 Fairtex Singha Beer Muay Thai Challenge 2009: Yod Nak Suu Vol. 4 || Tokyo, Japan || Decision (unanimous) || 5 || 3:00 ||
|-
! style="background:white" colspan=9 |
|-
|- bgcolor="CCFFCC"
| 2009-08-12 || Win ||align=left| Farsai Nongkipahuyuth || OneSongchai || Bangkok, Thailand || Decision || 4 || 3:00 ||
|-
! style="background:white" colspan=9 |
|-
|- bgcolor="CCFFCC"
| 2008-12-04 || Win ||align=left| Farni Kiatchionson || King's Birthday || Bangkok, Thailand || Decision || 4 || 3:00 ||
|-
! style="background:white" colspan=9 |
|-
|- bgcolor="FFBBBB"
| 2008-11-02 || Loss ||align=left| Duennapa Kiatkriengsak || Suek Assawindam || Bangkok, Thailand || Decision || 4 || 2:00 ||
|-
|- bgcolor="CCFFCC"
| 2008-09-05 || Win ||align=left|  Namfon Por Muangpetch || Channel 9 || Bangkok, Thailand || Decision || 4 || 2:00 ||
|-
|- bgcolor="CCFFCC"
| 2008-08-31 || Win ||align=left| Nongkluay Sor Penprapa || Suek Assawindam || Bangkok, Thailand || Decision || 4 || 2:00 ||
|-
|- bgcolor="CCFFCC"
| 2008-07-06 || Win ||align=left| Nong Gluay Sor Penprapa || Suek Assawindam || Bangkok, Thailand || Decision || 4 || 2:00 ||
|-
|- bgcolor="CCFFCC"
| 2008-03-02 || Win ||align=left| Jomkwan Sitpaneng || Suek Assawindam || Bangkok, Thailand || Decision || 4 || 2:00 ||
|-
|- bgcolor="CCFFCC"
| 2007-12-16 || Win ||align=left| Rabeabrat Peanratana || Suek Assawindam  || Bangkok, Thailand || Decision || 4 || 2:00 ||
|-
| colspan=9 | 
|-
| colspan=9 | Legend:

See also
List of female kickboxers

References

External links
 

1993 births
Zaza Sor. Aree
Living people
Zaza Sor. Aree
Zaza Sor. Aree